Ishar Singh (1895-1963) was a soldier in the British Indian Army and a recipient of the Victoria Cross.

Ishar Singh may also refer to:
 Ishar Singh (Sikh prince) (1802-1804)
 Ishar Singh (havildar) (1850s-1897), soldier in the British Indian Army with the rank of havildar, hero of the Battle of Saragarhi
 Ishar Singh (poet) (1892–1966), one of the most renowned Punjabi humorous poets of the 20th century

See also
 Ishar Singh Marhana (1878–1941), Akali activist and Ghadr revolutionary